Giorgos Georgiou,(1952) is a Greek TV and radio personality. He is now hosting a TV sports programme in TeleAsty channel, named "Το Καφενείο των Φιλάθλων". He was the main broadcaster in a programme with the same name the previous years in other Greek TV channels. He started his career in 1982 and from 1995 he hosts his programme "Το Καφενείο των Φιλάθλων".

He also performs programmes in the radio, in Nikos Hadjinikolaou's Real FM, and has an article on the sport newspaper "Φίλαθλος". (Filathlos, translating "Sports Fan").

References

1952 births
Living people
Greek television presenters
Greek journalists
Journalists from Athens